Diego De Leo (born 1951) is an Italian professor, doctor and psychiatrist. Until August 2015, he was the director of the Australian Institute for Suicide Research and Prevention (AISRAP), World Health Organization Collaborating Centre on Research and Training in Suicide Prevention at Griffith University in Brisbane, Australia.  He has been on the editorial board of Crisis: The Journal of Crisis Intervention and Suicide Prevention since 1990, was its Editor-in-Chief from 2008 to early 2018 (sharing with Annette Beautrais until 2010), and is now Editor emeritus of the journal. He is frequently quoted in Australian news reports as an expert on suicide prevention.

Early life and education
De Leo received a degree in medicine and Surgery at the University of Padua in 1977, and then a diploma in psychiatry, also at Padua.  In 1981 he studied behavioural sciences at the University of Leiden, the Netherlands. During this time a close colleague took his own life; this led De Leo to pursue suicide as a research topic.  He focused his research on suicides in the elderly, and completed his doctorate in 1988. His dissertation, entitled Sunset Depression, was developed into a book on self-destructive behaviour in the elderly, Depression and Suicide in Late Life.

Career
After graduation, De Leo developed TeleHelp, or TeleCheck, the first system  in Italy to provide medical and psycho-social assistance to frail elderly people living at home. He also helped start the Italian Association for Suicide Prevention, and an Italian registry for suicidal behaviours. He initiated and led the Psychogeriatric Service at the University of Padua in 1986 and a suicide research unit in 1992.

World Health Organization
De Leo presented findings from his dissertation on Sunset Depression to members of the World Health Organization in Geneva, and in 1991 was asked to organize a meeting in Padua, Italy, on the future of mental health in the world.  He continued to work with WHO, researching a number of topics from depression and stress-related conditions, and participating in international committees and task forces on the quality of suicide mortality data.

In collaboration with WHO Headquarters and the European Office he studied quality of life, particularly in the elderly. With David Jenkins, he created PEQOL, an evaluation package for quality of life in old age, and then with Jouko Lonnqvist, Rene Diekstra and Marco Trabucchi the LEIPAD. In 1995 he co-chaired WHOQOL, a project to develop an instrument for measuring health related quality of life.

De Leo was a member of the WHO/EURO Multi-Centre Study on Suicidal Behaviour from 1988 to 2001, and directed the WHO Collaborating Centre for Research and Training in Suicide Prevention at the University of Padua from 1997 to 2002.

In 2001, De Leo initiated the WHO/SUPRE-MISS study, which collated data from China, Iran, Vietnam, Brazil, South Africa, Estonia, India and Sri Lanka and demonstrated the importance of continuity of care in reducing suicide mortality. During his time as President of the International Association for Suicide Prevention, De Leo initiated World Suicide Prevention Day celebrated on 10 September every year since 2003.

In 2006 De Leo directed the Australian Institute for Suicide Research and Prevention, as well as the newly established WHO Collaborating Centre for Research and Training in Suicide Prevention at Griffith University. In the same year, he helped launch, with the Western Pacific Office of the WHO, the Suicide Trends in At-Risk Territories study, which involved 22 countries.

De Leo co-wrote a chapter on self-directed violence in the 2002 World Report on Violence and Health.  He drafted the Blue Booklet Series of WHO guidelines to media professionals, about recording of suicide data and registering of non-fatal suicidal behavior, and contributed to the suicide module of the WHO mhGAP program.

Australian Institute for Suicide Research and Prevention

De Leo became director of the Australian Institute for Suicide Research and Prevention at Griffith University in 1998.  In 2001 De Leo organised a post-graduate education program in Suicide Prevention Studies, and in 2002 AISRAP became an accredited agency for the delivery of suicide prevention training. In 2004, De Leo opened a research outpatient service, the Life Promotion Clinic, for suicidal patients, which specialised in psychological treatments and operated as a Royal Australian and New Zealand College of Psychiatrists agency, training psychiatry students.

Other research activities
De Leo set up in Italy the De Leo Fund Onlus, a scientific NGO that provides assistance and care to those who are bereaved by traumatic deaths and manages a national telephone helpline for people traumatized by sudden losses. He has endowed an award in remembrance of his children, which is presented biannually by The International Association for Suicide Prevention (IASP) to distinguished scholars of suicidal behaviours carried out in developing countries.

De Leo is the coordinator of the Andrej Marusic Institute, centre for suicide research at the University of Primorska, Slovenia.  He is affiliated with the Department of Community Medicine at the West Virginia University, a member of the Special Consortium on Suicide Prevention for the American Army, and an Honorary Professor of Psychiatry at the University of Queensland. He is a member of the Australian Suicide Prevention Advisory Council and the Queensland Advisory Group on Suicide (QAGS). He is co-founder of the Italian Society for PsychoOncology.

Publications
De Leo is the author of scientific articles and books.  His most recent volumes are Turning Points (2011), and Bereavement after Traumatic Deaths (2013). He is the founder and previous Editor-in-Chief of the Italian Journal of Suicidology, previous Editor-in-Chief of Crisis: The Journal of Crisis Intervention and Suicide Prevention, Editor-in-Chief of the Open Journal of Medical Psychology and editor of Suicide Research: Selected Readings.

Awards and honors
 The International Association for Suicide Prevention awarded him the Stengel Award in 1991 for his research in the field of suicidology.  
 In 2007 Griffith University awarded him the title of Doctor of Science for his research activities in the field of Suicidology and Psychogeriatrics.
 In 2007 he received the Life Research Award from the Commonwealth of Australia and Suicide Prevention Australia.  
 The American Association of Suicidology awarded him with the Louis Dublin Award for his contributions to the field of suicide prevention (2011). 
 In 2012 he was the winner of the Griffith University Research Leadership Award.
 In 2013, he was appointed as an Officer in the General Division of the Order of Australia for his contributions to the field of psychiatry and the creation of national and international strategies for suicide prevention.

Family life
De Leo is married to Cristina Trevisan, an interior decorator and modern art expert. They had two sons, both killed in a road accident in Italy in 2005.

References

External links
https://web.archive.org/web/20130531172040/http://www.griffith.edu.au/health/australian-institute-suicide-research-prevention/research/life-promotion-clinic
ASP awards (http://www.iasp.info/awards.php)

Living people
Italian psychiatrists
University of Padua alumni
Suicide in Australia
Suicidologists
1951 births